Prides are a Scottish indie band formed in Glasgow in 2013 and made up of Stewart Brock (lead vocals, keys) and Callum Wiseman (guitar, keys, backing vocals). They released their debut album The Way Back Up on 10 July 2015.

Career

The band performed at the 2014 Commonwealth Games closing ceremony in Glasgow with the track "Messiah" on 3 August 2014.

The band are managed by Ally McCrae and signed to Twin Music Inc.

Their song "Out of the Blue" is featured in FIFA 15.

Members
 Stewart Brock – lead vocals, keys
 Callum Wiseman – guitar, keys, backing vocals

Discography

Albums
 The Way Back Up (2015) #24 UK
 A Mind Like the Tide, Pt. 1 (EP) (2017)
 A Mind Like the Tide, Pt. 1 (Acoustic EP) (2017)
 A Mind Like the Tide, Pt. 2 (EP) (2018)
 A Mind Like the Tide, Pt. 2 (Acoustic EP) (2018)

Singles
 "The Seeds You Sow" (2014)
 "I Should Know You Better" (2014)
 "Out of the Blue" (2014)
 "Messiah" (2014)
 "Higher Love" (2015)
 "Rome" (2016)
 "Are You Ready" (2016)
 "Tinseltown in the Rain" (2016)
 "It Must Have Been Love" (2017)
 "Away with the Night" (2017)
 "What's Love Got to Do with It" (2017)
 "Let's Stay in Bed All Day" (2017)
 "Born To Be Whole" (2018)
 "Say It Again" (2018)

Media
 In 2013, the music featured in an advertisement for Sourz drinks was composed specifically by Prides.
 They sang "Messiah" in the closing ceremony of the 2014 Commonwealth Games on 3 August and has featured in a number of TV shows including Taking New York. 
Their single "Out of the Blue" was featured in EA-game FIFA 15.
 Their cover of "What's Love Got to Do with It" was featured in the 15th episode of the first season of Dynasty.

See also 
 List of bands from Glasgow
 List of Scottish musicians

References

External links
 
 Prides's channel on YouTube

2013 establishments in Scotland
Musical groups established in 2013
Musical groups from Glasgow
British musical trios
Scottish pop music groups